John Peter Ricketts (born August 19, 1964) is an American businessman and politician serving as the junior United States senator from Nebraska since 2023. A member of the Republican Party, he served as the 40th governor of Nebraska from 2015 to 2023. 

Ricketts is the eldest son of Joe Ricketts, founder of TD Ameritrade. He is also, with other family members, a part owner of Major League Baseball's Chicago Cubs. Ricketts unsuccessfully ran for the U.S. Senate in 2006, losing to incumbent Ben Nelson. He ran for governor of Nebraska in 2014, and after narrowly winning the six-way Republican primary, defeated Democratic Party nominee Chuck Hassebrook, 57% to 39%. He was reelected in 2018, defeating Democratic nominee Bob Krist, 59% to 41%. As governor, Ricketts approved various budgets and tax cuts. He was also a firm supporter of capital punishment, and in 2018 the state carried out its first execution since 1997.

Ricketts left office after his second term as governor of Nebraska in January 2023; shortly after, he was appointed to the U.S. Senate by his gubernatorial successor, Jim Pillen, to fill the vacancy left by the resignation of Ben Sasse. Ricketts is seeking election to complete Sasse's term in the 2024 special election and has announced he intends to seek a full six-year term in 2026.

Early life
Ricketts was born in Nebraska City on August 19, 1964, the oldest of four children of Joe Ricketts and Marlene (Volkmer) Ricketts. The family later moved to Omaha. Joe Ricketts founded First Omaha Securities in 1975, one of the first discount stockbrokers in the United States. It prospered, changing its name to Ameritrade, going public in 1997, and changing its name to TD Ameritrade after acquiring TD Waterhouse in 2006. Marlene was a teacher.

Ricketts and his siblings, Tom, Laura, and Todd, all attended Westside High School in Omaha, from which Ricketts graduated in 1982. He attended the University of Chicago, receiving a BA in biology in 1986 and an MBA in marketing and finance in 1991.

Business career
After completing graduate school, Ricketts returned to Omaha. He worked for the Union Pacific Railroad for a year, then as a salesman for a Chicago environmental consultant. In 1993, he went to work for his father's business, initially in the call center for a few months, and subsequently appointed by his father to a number of executive positions, ultimately becoming the company's chief operating officer during his father's tenure as CEO. In a 2006 report, he stated his net worth at between $45million and $50million.

In 1997, Ricketts married Susanne Shore. A native of Garden City, Kansas, Shore grew up in Tulsa, Oklahoma, and earned a bachelor's degree in English and then an MBA from Oklahoma State University. After a stint working for the dean of students at the University of South Dakota, she came to Omaha to complete a one-year course in nursing at Creighton University. At the time of her marriage to Ricketts, she was working as a nurse at St. Joseph's Hospital in Omaha. Ricketts and Shore have three children.

In 2006, Ricketts left Ameritrade to run for the U.S. Senate. After his loss to incumbent Ben Nelson, he returned to the company's board, remaining until the Ricketts family relinquished its board seats in 2016.

In 2007, Ricketts co-founded, and became director and president of the Platte Institute for Economic Research, which he called a "free market think tank", and which Nebraska newspapers have called "conservative". He resigned from the organization in 2013 to concentrate on his 2014 gubernatorial campaign. From 2007 to 2012, Ricketts was a national committeeman for the Republican National Committee; from 2007 to 2013, he was a trustee of the American Enterprise Institute.

Sports
In 2009, the Ricketts family trust bought the Chicago Cubs of Major League Baseball (MLB) from Tribune Media. Ricketts and his siblings hold four of the five seats on the team's board of directors.

World Series champion
As part owner of the Cubs, Ricketts has a 2016 World Series title to his credit, as they won the championship that year, defeating the Cleveland Indians.

Governor of Nebraska

Elections

2014

In the 2014 election, Ricketts ran for the Nebraska governorship. The incumbent, Dave Heineman, was barred by Nebraska's term-limits law from running for reelection. Two candidates considered strong contenders for the Republican nomination withdrew by early 2013: Lieutenant Governor Rick Sheehy, who was embroiled in a scandal; and Speaker of the Legislature Mike Flood, whose wife had been diagnosed with cancer. Ricketts officially joined the race in September 2013, at which point he and state auditor Mike Foley were regarded as the front-runners in a race that also included State Senators Charlie Janssen, Beau McCoy, and Tom Carlson. In February 2014, Janssen withdrew, and Nebraska Attorney General Jon Bruning declared his candidacy. Despite his late entrance, Bruning supplanted Ricketts as the perceived front-runner.

Ricketts won the May 2014 primary with 26.6% of the vote to Bruning's 25.5%, McCoy's 20.9%, Foley's 19.2%, Carlson's 4.1%, and Omaha attorney Bryan Slone's 3.7%. In the general election, Ricketts faced Chuck Hassebrook, who had run unopposed for the Democratic nomination. Hassebrook was a former member of the University of Nebraska Board of Regents, and former director of the Center for Rural Affairs, which calls itself "a leading nonprofit organization with a national reputation for progressive rural advocacy and policy work". Ricketts advocated tax reductions; Hassebrook argued that Ricketts's proposed cuts would primarily benefit the rich and deprive the state of funds for what he called needed public services. Ricketts opposed the proposed expansion of Medicaid under the provisions of the 2010 Patient Protection and Affordable Care Act; Hassebrook favored the expansion. Ricketts opposed an increase in the state's minimum wage; Hassebrook supported it.

Over the course of the general-election campaign, Ricketts outspent Hassebrook by a considerable margin. In the last spending report filed before the election, he stated that he had loaned his campaign $930,000, and that the organization had spent about $6 million. Hassebrook reported expenditures of slightly more than $2.5 million.

In the general election, Ricketts received 57.1% of the vote to Hassebrook's 39.2%. Libertarian Mark G. Elworth Jr. received 3.5%, and write-in votes accounted for 0.1%.

2018

On June 5, 2017, Ricketts announced his candidacy for reelection. During his speech, he said "lowering property taxes" would be his main concern if he were reelected. He also asked Nebraskans to "rehire" Lieutenant Governor Mike Foley. Ricketts was reelected on November 6 with 59.0% of the vote.

Tenure
Ricketts was inaugurated as the 40th governor of Nebraska at the Nebraska State Capitol on January 8, 2015.

2015 session
Among the "most significant" actions the legislature took in its 2015 session were three bills that passed over Ricketts's veto. LB268 repealed the state's death penalty; LB623 reversed the state's previous policy of denying driver's licenses to people who were living illegally in the U.S. after being brought to the country as children, and who had been granted exemption from deportation under the Barack Obama administration's Deferred Action for Childhood Arrivals (DACA) program; and LB610 increased the tax on gasoline to pay for repairs to roads and bridges.

After Ricketts's veto of the death-penalty repeal was overridden, capital-punishment proponents launched a petition drive to reverse the legislature's action. Their efforts gathered enough signatures to suspend the repeal until a public vote could be held. Capital-punishment opponents then filed a lawsuit arguing that the petition should be invalidated on the grounds that Ricketts, who had contributed $200,000 to the campaign, was "the primary initiating force" for the petition drive and should have been included in the list of sponsors required by Nebraska law. In February 2016, a Lancaster County district judge dismissed the lawsuit, ruling that Ricketts's financial support of the petition effort did not ipso facto make him a sponsor. The plaintiffs appealed the issue to the Nebraska Supreme Court, which upheld the district court's dismissal. The referendum was held in the 2016 general election and the death penalty was retained with 61.2% of the vote.

2016 session
In its 2016 session, the legislature passed three bills that Ricketts vetoed. LB580 would have created an independent commission of citizens to draw new district maps following censuses; supporters described it as an attempt to depoliticize the redistricting process, while Ricketts maintained that the bill delegated the legislature's constitutional duty of redistricting to "an unelected and unaccountable board". The bill's sponsor, John Murante, opted not to seek an override of the veto. A second vetoed bill, LB935, would have changed state audit procedures; it passed by a margin of 37–8, with 4 present and not voting. The bill was withdrawn without an attempt to override the veto; the state auditor agreed to work with Ricketts on a new version for the next year's session. A third bill, LB947, made DACA beneficiaries eligible for commercial and professional licenses in Nebraska. The bill passed the legislature on a vote of 33–11–5; the veto override passed 31–13–5.

At the 2016 Republican state convention, Ricketts denounced several legislators who had failed to support his and the party's positions on various bills, and called for the election of more "platform Republicans" to the officially nonpartisan legislature. In response to this, 13 legislators, including five registered Republicans, released a statement in which they accused Ricketts of placing partisanship above principle. One of the signers of the statement, Laura Ebke, changed her registration from Republican to Libertarian shortly thereafter, citing Ricketts's speech as one of the factors that drove her to make the change.

2017 session

In its 2017 session, the Ricketts administration merged two agencies. The Department of Transportation was formed from the merging of the Department of Roads and Department of Aeronautics. This merger was led by Senator Friesen. Senator Murante led the merger of the Nebraska Department of Veterans' Affairs and the Division of Veterans' Homes into the Nebraska Department of Veterans' Affairs. Ricketts signed both merger bills into law in the spring of 2017.

Ricketts signed various bills designed to strengthen Nebraska communities. LB 518 created various grants to counties to construct workforce housing. The legislature also passed 2 anti-abortion bills, the first in his tenure. LB46 created a "Choose Life" license plate, and LB506 provided information about perinatal hospice care to pregnant women diagnosed with a lethal fetal anomaly.

2018 session
In the start of the 2018 to 2019 biannual session, Ricketts highlighted various bills as his key priorities. In 2018, he signed LB 1040, which creates commemorative certificates of nonviable birth for miscarriages. Ricketts said this bill "affirms the pre-born baby's dignity, [and] it also provides closure to mothers, fathers, and families who are grappling with the pain and heartache of losing a child." Ricketts also signed various property and tax relief bills during the session. He vetoed a notable bill, LB350, which would have allowed felons to petition a court to set aside their convictions after serving their sentences. Ricketts said, "This bill sends the wrong message to victims of crime and society. It represents poor public policy."

2019 session
During the legislature's 2019 session, Ricketts approved various budgets and tax cuts. LB 103 stopped automatic property tax increases. Ricketts also spearheaded the project to increase the Property Tax Credit Relief Fund by $51 million for a total of $550 million in direct property tax relief from 2019 to 2021. He merged two state agencies, the Department of Environment and the Department of Energy, into one, the Nebraska Department of Environment and Energy.

2020 session
In 2020, Ricketts signed numerous laws passed by the legislature, including property and veterans tax relief bills, dismemberment abortion bans, and flood and pandemic relief. In 2020, Ricketts made some workforce reforms, providing a new partnership between Peru State College and the Nebraska Department of Corrections, to provide a path for students to go from the classroom into the corrections workforce. He also signed an infrastructure bill, funding repair of the Gering-Fort Laramie Irrigation Canal after it collapsed in 2019.

COVID-19 pandemic

In June 2020, Ricketts threatened to withhold $100 million in federal COVID-19 relief if local governments in Nebraska required people who entered courthouses and other local government offices to wear face masks. Health experts and authorities had recommended face masks as an effective way to halt the virus's spread.

In October 2021, Ricketts ordered Nebraska state agencies not to comply with the federal government's vaccine requirements for employees.

2021 session
Ricketts called the 2021 session "historic", as it fulfilled multiple priorities he highlighted in his January 2021 State of the State address. These included property and veterans tax relief, broadband infrastructure, and locking in the state's budget. The session limited budget growth to 2.4% annually. Ricketts's veterans tax relief program gave Nebraska veterans a 100% exemption on military retirement benefits. Ricketts signed legislation to support military spouses licensed in another state to obtain teaching permits after moving to Nebraska. He signed into law a bill that gives private schools $3 million in funding for textbook loans and $1 billion to support public K-12 education. Ricketts also passed career scholarship reform, giving public, private, and community colleges and universities state scholarship support.

2022 session

After the 2022 legislative session, Ricketts praised the senators for passing legislation on his priorities. The legislature authorized construction of a canal to protect Nebraska's legal entitlement to South Platte River flowing into the state from Colorado. Ricketts also signed bills to further develop Nebraska's water infrastructure, construct new marinas at Lake McConaughy and Lewis and Clark Lake, and create a 3,600-acre reservoir between Lincoln and Omaha.

U.S. Senate

2006 election

Ricketts was the 2006 Republican nominee for the U.S. Senate seat held by Democrat Ben Nelson. His opponents in the primary were former Nebraska Attorney General Don Stenberg and former state Republican chairman David Kramer. Ricketts spent nearly $5 million of his own money, outspending his opponents 10–1 in winning the nomination.

Ricketts received some high-profile campaign assistance, most notably from President George W. Bush and Vice President Dick Cheney. Bush appeared at a campaign rally for Ricketts on November 5, 2006, just days before the election, in Grand Island, Nebraska.

Ricketts ran on a conservative platform, emphasizing fiscal responsibility, immigration reform, and agriculture, as well as championing a socially conservative platform opposing same-sex marriage and abortion. In all, he contributed $11,302,078 of his own money to his campaign, triggering the Millionaire's Amendment, which allowed his opponent to raise larger amounts from each donor. He spent more money than any Senate candidate in Nebraska history, but lost to Nelson by a margin of 36%–64%.

Appointment
On January 8, 2023, U.S. Senator Ben Sasse resigned to become president of the University of Florida. On January 12, Jim Pillen, who had succeeded Ricketts as governor one week earlier, appointed Ricketts to the Senate. Ricketts's appointment was controversial, as he had financially supported Pillen's 2022 gubernatorial campaign. Pillen denied this had any role in his decision to appoint Ricketts. Upon his appointment to the Senate, Ricketts announced that he would run in the 2024 special election to serve the remaining two years of Sasse's term.

Tenure
Ricketts was sworn in as Nebraska's junior U.S. senator by Vice President Kamala Harris on January 23, 2023.

Committees

Political positions

Abortion
Ricketts supports a total ban of abortion, with no exceptions for rape or incest.

Affirmative action
Before becoming governor, Ricketts supported an initiative to ban affirmative action in Nebraska, donating $15,000 to a group behind the effort.

Critical race theory
In 2021, Ricketts said he opposed critical race theory. Asked to explain what critical race theory was, Ricketts said it was "one that really starts creating those divisions between us about defining who we are based on race and that sort of thing and really not about how to bring us together as Americans rather than—and dividing us and also having a lot of very socialist-type ideas about how that would be implemented in our state." Ricketts also called it "Marxist" and "really un-American."

Death penalty
Ricketts supports the death penalty. In 2015, he vetoed a bill to abolish capital punishment in Nebraska, but the legislature overrode his veto. In 2016, Ricketts spent part of his family fortune to finance a referendum to reinstate capital punishment in the state. The referendum passed, and in 2018 the state executed Carey Dean Moore, the first inmate put to death in the state in 21 years. Ricketts, a Catholic, rebuffed calls from the Catholic Church to halt executions.

Donald Trump
Ricketts criticized the impeachment of Donald Trump over his request that Ukraine start an investigation into his political rival Joe Biden. Ricketts said the impeachment proceedings were a "partisan impeachment parade" and praised the Senate for acquitting Trump.

Cannabis
Ricketts opposes legalization of medicinal cannabis. In 2019, he said that its "medicinal value has not been tested", and cited studies suggesting that cannabis adversely affects brain functions. He also pointed to overdoses of the synthetic cannabinoid K2 as a "reminder of how dangerous cannabis can be". In 2021, while the Nebraska legislature was contemplating legalizing medical cannabis, he claimed, "If you legalize marijuana, you’re gonna kill your kids. That’s what the data shows from around the country."

Environment
Ricketts opposed the Obama administration's Clean Power Plan to reduce greenhouse gas emissions. He supported the Keystone XL Pipeline, saying it would "create jobs here in Nebraska, lots of tax revenues here in Nebraska, of course help us become less dependent on foreign oil."

In 2021, Ricketts said he opposed a proposal by President Joe Biden to preserve 30% of the nation's land and water by 2030, calling it a "radical climate agenda."

Political contributions
In July 2022, Ricketts contributed $250,000 to a political action committee created to oppose the U.S. Senate campaign of Eric Greitens in advance of Missouri's August primary election.

Personal life
Ricketts is a Roman Catholic. He is a member of the Knights of Columbus and a Knight of the Holy Sepulchre.

Electoral history

2006 election

2014 election

2018 election

References

External links
Senator Pete Ricketts official U.S. Senate website
 Pete Ricketts for Senate official campaign site

 
 
 2006 CD1 campaign funding for Pete Ricketts

|-

|-

|-

|-

|-

 
|-

1964 births
20th-century American businesspeople
21st-century American politicians
American business executives
Businesspeople from Omaha, Nebraska
Candidates in the 2006 United States elections
Catholics from Nebraska
Chicago Cubs owners
Living people
People from Nebraska City, Nebraska
Republican Party governors of Nebraska
Republican Party United States senators from Nebraska
Ricketts family
Toronto-Dominion Bank people
University of Chicago Booth School of Business alumni
American Roman Catholics